"Krazy" is first single released by Pitbull from his album Pitbull Starring in Rebelution. It features crunk rapper Lil Jon. The song peaked at number 30 on the US Billboard Hot 100. The song samples Federico Franchi's 2007 song "Cream". Another version of "Krazy" that's played in San Diego, mentions all the sites in the area.

The instrumental of the song was also re-sampled in 2015 on the song "Cream", by Tujamo and Danny Avila, released on Spinnin' Records.

Music video
The music video premiered on October 15, 2008. Fat Joe, Casely, LMFAO, Hurricane Chris and Rick Ross make cameo appearances in the video. The music video had been viewed more than 30 million times through Pitbull's official channel on YouTube.

The video was later removed and was then released onto Pitbull's official Vevo channel on October 15, 2010. It has received over 9 million views as of May 2020.

Soundtrack usage
The original recording of the song was included on the original motion picture soundtrack for 2009's Fast & Furious 4. The Spanish version of the song was used in 2013's Turbo, and was included on the movie's official soundtrack, Turbo: Music from the Motion Picture.

Track listing

Download single
 "Krazy" (featuring Lil Jon) - 3:48

Download single (Spanish version)
 "Krazy" (Spanish version) (featuring Lil Jon) - 3:48

Charts

Certifications

References 

2008 singles
2008 songs
Pitbull (rapper) songs
Lil Jon songs
Song recordings produced by Lil Jon
Songs written by Pitbull (rapper)
Songs written by Lil Jon
Crunk songs